Miosynechodus is a dubious genus of extinct ray from the Miocene of Sri Lanka. It was originally identified as a fin spine from a late-surviving hybodontid, but it is now considered to be a myliobatiform tail stinger. A single species is known, Miosynechodus mora, which was named in 1969.

Description
The holotype of Miosynechodus is a single tail stinger from Deraniyagala's personal collection.

References

Myliobatiformes
Prehistoric cartilaginous fish genera
Miocene fish